Paul Hogh (born 1 August 1933) is a German boxer. He competed in the men's light middleweight event at the 1964 Summer Olympics.

References

1933 births
Living people
German male boxers
Olympic boxers of the United Team of Germany
Boxers at the 1964 Summer Olympics
People from Turčianske Teplice District
Sportspeople from the Žilina Region
Light-middleweight boxers